Bazoches-au-Houlme is a commune in the Orne department in northwestern France.

Population

See also
 Communes of the Orne department

References

Communes of Orne